NA-87 Khushab-I consists of 2 National Assembly (NA) and 3 Punjab Provincial Assembly constituencies.

Members of Parliament
1946: Malik Khizar Hayat Tiwana

1988—2002: NA-51 Sargodha-cum-Khushab

1991: Qazi Mureed Ahmed (Muslim League)

2002-2018: NA-69 Khushab-I

2018-2022: NA-93 Khushab-I

Election 2002 

General elections were held on 10 Oct 2002. Sumaira Malik of National Alliance won by 71,925 votes.

Election 2008 

The result of general election 2008 in this constituency is given below.

Result 
Sumaira Malik succeeded in the election 2008 and became the member of National Assembly.

Election 2013 

General elections were held on 11 May 2013. Malik Muhammad Uzair Khan of PML-N won the seat and became the member of National Assembly.

Election 2018 

General elections were held on 25 July 2018.

By-election 2023 
A by-election will be held on 19 March 2023 due to the resignation of Umer Aslam Awan, the previous MNA from this seat.

See also
NA-86 Sargodha-V
NA-88 Khushab-II

References

External links 
Election result's official website

NA-069